DanSing for You is a Cypriot reality show airing on Mega Channel Cyprus and filming live in Nicosia.

Structure 
The show combines the dance and the singing. It first aired on September 11, 2011 and it has a charity purpose. The viewers vote every week via phone and/or text for which couple they want to continue on the show. At the end of every live one couple from the dancing part of the competition and one from the singing part gets eliminated.

Each season, the money from the voting process go to a specific organization. The first season's income went to the Pediatric Oncology Unit of Makarios Hospital in Nicosia, the second's to the Pancyprian Association "Gia Ena Oneiro, Mia Euxi" (For a Dream, a Wish) and the third's to the Anticancer Association of Cyprus.

Cast

Hosts
Since its premiere in 2010, the show was hosted by Christiana Aristotelous. There was also a co-host for the backstage room, also known as Green Room. The co-host for all three seasons was Vagelis Evaggelou.

Key:  Previous   Current

Judges
Evi Droutsa, Jake Athanasiadis and Alex Panayi were the judges of the first season. In the second season, Droutsa and Athanasiadis returned as judges while Panayi was replaced by Nikos Mouratidis. The judges of the second season returned for the third season.

In February 2014, the network ceased their cooperation with the judge Mouratidis due to bad behavior during the semifinal against a contestant.

Key:  Previous   Current

Series overview

Notes
 a.  In the middle of the competition, four new couples were added to compete for the rest of the show
 b.  In the middle of the competition, two new couples were added to compete for the rest of the show and one new contestant replaced another one who withdrew

Season 1 (2011) 
The first season of the show premiered on September 11, 2011. Host of the show was Christiana Aristotelous and the judges were Evi Droutsa, Jake Athanasiadis and Alex Panayi. The celebrities who competed this season were eight for the dancing part of the competition and eight for the singing part, sixteen in total. The show ended on October 30, 2011 and winners were Electra Fotiadou on the singing part of the competition and Andreas Filaktou on the dancing part.

During the live shows, different guest judges appeared to judge the couples. Katerina Zarifi was a guest judge on the third live, Spiros Charitatos appeared on the fourth live, Nikos Mouratidis on the fifth and Maria Mpekatorou on the sixth. Grigoris Arnaoutoglou was a guest judge on the semi-final and Victoras Papadopoulos guested in the finals.

Couples

Season 2 (2012) 
The second season of the show premiered on September 30, 2012. Host of the show was Christiana Aristotelous and the judges were Evi Droutsa, Jake Athanasiadis and Nikos Mouratidis. The celebrities who competed this season were ten for the dancing part of the competition and ten for the singing part, twenty in total.

In November 2012 it was announced that four new couples would be added to the remaining ones and would compete for the rest of the show. The four new couples made their first appearance on November 18, 2012. One of the new contestants was going to be the politician Andreas Pitsillidis but his participation was cancelled after the party of Pitsillidis reacted negative to the announcement of his name as contestant. Pitsillidis was replaced by the actor Costas Schiniou

On October 28, 2012, at the end of the fifth live,  Konstantia Pavlou  withdrew from the competition due to injury and on December 2, 2012, right after their appearance at the tenth live, the professional dancer Angela Georgiou and partner of Marinos Konsolos announced that she had to leave the show due to pregnancy. Konsolos continued his appearances with his new partner, Eirini Konsolou.

The show ended on December 16, 2012 and the winners were Andri Karantoni on the singing part of the competition and Marinos Konsolos on the dancing part.

Couples

‡Indicates the couples who were added to the show in the middle of the competition

Season 3 (2013 — 2014) 
The third season of the show premiered on November 17, 2013. Host of the show was Christiana Aristotelous and the judges were Evi Droutsa, Jake Athanasiadis and Nikos Mouratidis. The celebrities who competed this season were eleven for the dancing part of the competition and eleven for the singing part, twenty-two in total.

On December 1, 2013, at the end of the third live, the professional singer Kipros Charilaou and partner of Stella Stilianou announced that he had to leave the show for personal reasons. Stilianou continued her appearances with her new partner,  Mikaella Hatziefrem. On December 15, 2013, at the end of fifth live, Panagiotis Dimopoulos withdrew from the competition due to injury and he was replaced by the wardrobe stylist Nikolas Ioannidis. Also, Aristotelous announced that two new couples would be added from the next live and compete to the remaining competition.

The show ended on February 2, 2014 and the winners were Irodotos Miltiadous on the singing part of the competition and Eva Papageorgopoulou on the dancing part. During the final live show, Aristotelous didn't feel well and she had to withdraw. Giorgos Roussos stepped in to host the rest of the final.

Few days after the end of the show, Mega Channel Cyprus ceased its cooperation with the judge Mouratidis due to bad behavior during the semifinal against a contestant.

Couples

1Replaced Panagiotis Dimopoulos who withdrew at the end of the fifth live‡Indicates the couples who were added to the show in the middle of the competition

Season 4 
Giorgos Chouliaras, the general manager of Mega, announced that there will be a fourth season but he didn't give any more details about it.

References

Dance competition television shows
Singing talent shows
Cypriot reality television series
Greek-language television shows
2010s Cypriot television series
2011 Cypriot television series debuts
2016 Cypriot television series endings